Bloxom is a surname. Notable people with the surname include:

Craig Bloxom (born 1959), Australian bass player and singer 
Robert Bloxom (1937–2020), American politician
Robert Bloxom Jr. (born 1963), American businessman and politician, son of Robert